Fort is a surname. Notable people with the surname include:

Austin Fort (born 1995), American football player
Charles Fort (1874–1932), American journalist and philosopher
Charles Fort (poet) (born 1951), American poet
Cornelia Fort (1919–1943), American aviator
De Witt Clinton Fort (1830–1868), American politician
Franklin W. Fort (1880–1937), American politician
Garrett Fort (1900–1948), American screenwriter
George F. Fort (1809–1872), American politician
Greenbury L. Fort (1825–1883), American politician
Guy Fort (1879–1942), American military officer
Jeff Fort (born 1947), American gang leader and convicted terrorist
John Franklin Fort (1852–1920), American politician
M. K. Fort Jr. (1921–1964), American mathematician
Marron Curtis Fort (1938–2019), American-German translator and educator
Matthew Fort (born 1954), British food writer and critic
Neal Fort (born 1968), American footballer
Pascual Fort (1927–1991), Catalan printmaker
Paul Fort (1872–1960), French poet
Pavel Fořt (born 1983), Czech footballer
Ricardo Fort (1968–2013), Argentine socialite
Robert Boal Fort (1867–1904), American politician